Cynthia Diane Payne (née Paine; 24 December 193215 November 2015) was an English brothel keeper and party hostess who made headlines in the 1970s and 1980s, when she was convicted of running a brothel at 32 Ambleside Avenue, in Streatham, a suburb in south London.

Life
Known as "Madame Cyn", Payne first came to national attention in 1978 when police raided her home while a sex party was in progress. Men paid with luncheon vouchers to dress up in lingerie and be spanked by young women. Police found 53 men at her residence, in varying levels of undress, including "a peer of the realm, an MP, a number of solicitors and company directors and several vicars". A cartoon in the press at the time, according to Sarah Baxter in The Sunday Times, "showed a vicar in bed with a prostitute, confronted by a policeman. 'I demand to see my solicitor,' said the vicar, 'who is in the next bedroom.'"

When the case came to trial in 1980, Payne was sentenced to 18 months in prison, reduced to a fine and six months on appeal. She served four months in Holloway prison.

In 1986 the police raided Payne's home again, this time during a "special party" she was hosting after shooting of the film of her life had been completed. Although she was acquitted on this occasion, the resulting court case in 1987 made headlines for several weeks with lurid tales, some details of which she aired on The Dame Edna Experience in 1987, with co-guests Sir John Mills and Rudolf Nureyev, on which she also launched her book, Entertaining at Home. The court case ended Payne's career as a party giver.

On the programme, Payne expressed an interest in becoming a Member of Parliament in order to change Britain's sex laws, which she followed through by standing for Parliament as a candidate for the Payne and Pleasure Party in the Kensington by-election in July 1988, followed by her standing in her own area of Streatham for the Rainbow Dream Ticket in the 1992 UK General Election. She did not gain a parliamentary seat.

There are two comedy films that are loosely based on her life, both released in 1987: Wish You Were Here, about her adolescence, with Emily Lloyd in the lead role, and Personal Services, about her adult life, starring Julie Walters as Cynthia and directed by Terry Jones. Both were written by David Leland, who directed Wish You Were Here.

Payne made appearances as an after-dinner speaker and launched a range of "adult" services and products in 2006.

Payne died at King's College Hospital on 15 November 2015, aged 82. Her family celebrated her life a month later with a colourful humanist funeral, in accordance with her wishes.

Selected works

See also
Heidi Fleiss
Isabel Luberza Oppenheimer

References

External links
 

1932 births
2015 deaths
English brothel owners and madams
English humanists
People acquitted of crimes
People from Bognor Regis
People from Streatham
20th-century British businesspeople